The Bristol 411 is an automobile which was built by the British manufacturer Bristol Cars from 1969 to 1976. It was the fifth series of Chrysler-V8 engined Bristol models. The car was rated highly for its comfort, performance and handling by contemporary reviewers.

With the 411, Bristol, for the first time since the 407 was introduced, made a change of engine. Although they were still using a Chrysler V8 engine, the old A type engine was gone. Replacing it was the much larger big-block B series engine of  - as compared to the 5,211 cc of the 410. This much larger engine gave the 411 an estimated 30 percent more power than had been found in the 410. The 411 was capable of 230 km/h (143 mph). To cope with this extra power, a limited slip differential was fitted.

The interior showed a number of important changes from the Bristol 410. The traditional Blümel twin-spoke steering wheel was replaced by a more practical three-spoked leather-wrapped wheel, which as a result of the traditional Bristol badge being removed from the front of the car, was the only place where this badge was retained.

Changes
Over its seven years in production, the 411 showed a number of changes. The 1971 Series 2 added self-levelling suspension and a metric odometer, while the Series 3 from a year later had a lower compression ratio and completely revised styling. This edition was the first Bristol to possess the four-headlamp layout that was oddly anticipated by some of the company's earliest models, and to power this a bigger alternator was used. The rear lights were also changed using vertically mounted rectangular Lucas clusters, that carried over to the early 603 models. The Series 5 made from 1975 to 1976 had the original Bristol badge restored and was the first Bristol to feature inertia reel seat belts.

In the 2010s Bristol Cars offered a modernised version of the Bristol 411, the Series 6. This was a refurbished version based on existing 411s. The only engine is the fuel injected 5.9 litre V8 as used in the later Bristol Blenheim, allowing for up to  depending on the customer's desires.

Notes

External links

Bristol Owners Club, Bristol Type 411
Bristol Series 6

411
Bristol 411
Cars introduced in 1969
Sports sedans
Rear-wheel-drive vehicles